Satah Mountain is a twin-peaked mountain in the West-Central Interior of British Columbia, Canada. It is southeast of Punkutlaenkut Lake and east of the community of Anahim Lake in Range 3 Coast Land District.

History
The name of the mountain was adopted 13 March 1947 on topographic map 93/SW. Prior to this, the mountain was given the name Mount Lion which appeared on 2T268, a plan drawn in 1923 by W. Merston who was a member of the Association of British Columbia Land Surveyors (BCLS). The name Satah is Chilcotin in origin, meaning "Of the Sun and Moon".

Merston made some land surveys in the Upper Chilcotin Valley and a triangulation and topographical survey over an area extending eastward from Anahim Peak to the 124th meridian.

Geology
Satah Mountain is a complex volcanic cone of trachyte, benmoreite and basaltic trachyandesite. A small breached scoria ring on the northern flank of Satah Mountain appears largely unmodified by glacial erosion, implying that it might be younger than the main edifice.

Satah Mountain is one of the largest volcanoes in the Satah Mountain volcanic field (SMVF). Polygenetic in nature, the volcano was sporadically active 1.83–1.77 million years ago during the Early Pleistocene. This contrasts with most SMVF volcanoes, which are smaller in volume and likely had episodic and short-lived activity.

See also
List of volcanoes in Canada

References

External links

Anahim Volcanic Belt
Volcanoes of British Columbia
Landforms of the Chilcotin
Pleistocene volcanoes
Polygenetic volcanoes